Alfa Romeo made a series of 2.1-litre to 3.0-litre, naturally-aspirated and turbocharged, V-12 and flat-12, Grand Prix and Sports car racing engines designed for Formula One, the World Sportscar Championship, Can-Am, the Nordic Challenge Cup, and Interserie; starting in 1973, with their Alfa Romeo 33TT12 Group 5 sports car. Their first was a Carlo Chiti-designed Alfa Romeo flat-12 engine (essentially a 180° V-12) which had been used earlier in the Alfa Romeo 33TT12 and 33SC12 sports cars. In  this engine was supplied to Brabham and the deal continued until . The engine was dubbed the 115-12, and was a 180° V12 engine; essentially making it a flat-12 engine. Their second 12-cylinder engine, dubbed the 1260, debuted at the 1979 Italian Grand Prix. This time, the engine configuration was a conventional 60° V-12, rather than a flat layout.

Applications

Formula 1 cars
Brabham BT45
Brabham BT46
Alfa Romeo 177
Alfa Romeo 179
Alfa Romeo 182

Sports cars
Alfa Romeo Tipo 33

References 

V12
Gasoline engines by model
Flat engines
V12 engines
Formula One engines